The Most Esteemed Order of the Gallant Prince Syed Sirajuddin Jamalullail is a Malaysian dynastic order of merit founded by Sirajuddin of Perlis in 2001.

The Order consists of the Grand Master (currently Sirajuddin) and three Classes of members:
Knight Grand Companion
Knight Companion
Knight Commander
Members belong to either the Civil or the Military Division. Recipients of the Order are usually senior politicians or senior civil servants. Commonwealth citizens who are not subjects of the Raja and foreign nationals may be made Honorary Members.

The Order of the Gallant Prince Syed Sirajuddin Jamalullail is the fifth-most senior of the Perlis Orders of Merit, after Royal Family Order of Perlis, Perlis Family Order of the Gallant Prince Syed Putra Jamalullail, Order of Dato’ Bendahara Sri Jamalullail and Order of the Gallant Prince Syed Putra Jamalullail.

Composition

Grand Master 
The Perlis Sovereign is the Grand Master of the Order of the Gallant Prince Syed Sirajuddin Jamalullail. As with all honours except those in the Grand Master's personal gift, the Grand Master makes all appointments to the Order on the advice of the Government.

Precedence and privileges 
Members of the Order of the Gallant Prince Syed Sirajuddin Jamalullail are assigned positions in the order of precedence. (See order of precedence in Perlis for the exact positions.)

Knights Grand Companion prefix "Dato' Seri Diraja", Knights Companion prefix "Dato' Paduka", to their forenames. Wives of Knights Grand Companion and Knights Companion may prefix "Datin Seri Diraja" and "Datin Paduka" to their surnames respectively, but no equivalent privilege exists for husbands. Knights Commander prefix "Dato'" to their forenames. Wives of Knights Commander may prefix "Datin" to their surnames, but again, no equivalent privilege exists for husbands.

Knights Grand Companion use the post-nominal "SSSJ"; Knights Companion use "DSSJ"; Knights Commander use "DSPJ".

Revocation 
It is possible for membership in the Order to be revoked. Since its inception, however, no recipient has had their award revoked.

Current Knights Grand Companion 
 Grand Master: Tuanku Syed Sirajuddin ibni Almarhum Tuanku Syed Putra Jamalullail

Knights Grand Companion

Knights Companion

References 

Orders of chivalry of Malaysia
Orders, decorations, and medals of Perlis
Perlis